The Scottish Greens (also known as the Scottish Green Party;) are a green political party in Scotland. The party has seven MSPs in the Scottish Parliament as of May 2021. As of the 2022 local elections, the party sits on 13 of the 32 Scottish local councils, with a total of 35 councillors. They hold two ministerial posts in the third Sturgeon government following a power-sharing agreement with the SNP in August 2021, marking the first time Green party politicians will be in government in the UK.

The Scottish Greens were created in 1990 when the former Green Party separated into two independent parties, representing Scotland and England and Wales. The party is affiliated to the Global Greens and the European Green Party.

Party membership increased dramatically following the Scottish independence referendum, during which it supported Scotland's independence from the United Kingdom.

Organisation
The Scottish Greens are fully independent, but work closely with the other green parties from Ireland: the Green Party Northern Ireland and the Green Party of Ireland. Until October 2022, it also cooperated with the Green Party of England and Wales. It is a full member of the European Green Party. The party currently has seven MSPs and nineteen councillors. At the 2005 Westminster election, the party contested 19 seats and polled 25,760 votes, they returned no MPs. Its highest share of the vote was 7.7% of the vote in Glasgow North. In the European Parliament election of 2004, it polled 6.8% of the vote and did not return any MEPs. The party lost five of their seven seats in the 2007 Scottish Parliament election.

According to accounts filed with the Electoral Commission for the year ending 31 December 2009, the party had an income of about £90,230 that year, an expenditure of £61,165 and a membership of 1,072.

Membership
Within days of the Scottish independence referendum being held, the membership swelled to more than 5,000. Launching its manifesto for the 2015 UK general election, the Scottish Greens stated a membership of over 8,500. By October 2015 the party were holding their biggest ever conference, with their membership standing at more than 9,000. It has since fallen back somewhat, and was reported as standing at 7,500 in mid-2021.

Conferences
The Scottish Greens hold conferences every Spring and Autumn, where members from throughout Scotland attend to deal with all the business of the party, with members voting on conference motions and policy motions.

Party Council
Between conferences, the Party Council provides the forum for strategic decisions, policy discussions, oversight and branch coordination. The council is composed of two delegates from branches, usually branch co-convenors, representative and special interest groups. The council is currently led by only one Council Co-Convenor Laura Moodie pending the election of another Co-Convenor after the resignation of James Puchowski.

Party Executive Committee
The party's day-to-day administration is supervised by the Executive Committee which is currently led by Executive Co-Chairs Ross Greer and Ellie Gomersall. This committee also oversees the work of the elected National Committees; Finance & Fundraising, Elections & Campaigns, Policy, Membership and International.

Branches
The party is made up of branches, who usually cover one or more local authority areas, and meet on a regular basis.

Representation and special interest groups
The Scottish Greens have five self-organised representation groups:
 Scottish Young Greens
 Women's Network
 Rainbow Greens
 Disabled Greens
 Greens of Colour

They also currently have one formally recognised special interest group:
 Scottish Green Party Trade Union Group

These groups have additional meetings and discussions which are separate from the main party meetings.

History
The Scottish Green Party originated as the Scottish branch of the Ecology Party, founded in 1978 by Leslie Spoor. The Ecology Party became the UK Green Party and it remained a constituent party until 1990, when the Scottish Green Party became a separate entity. The separation was entirely amicable, as part of the green commitment to decentralisation: the Scottish Green Party supported the referendum on Scottish independence and opposed Britain's entry into the European Common Market in its 1989 European election manifesto, claiming that the Common Market would cause mass unemployment for Scottish workers, force Scotland to move towards a tourist-based economy, enable the destruction of local food markets and cause catastrophic environmental damage – for this reason, the party campaigned for a Europe-wide confederation of individuals on global issues affecting the environment.

The Scottish Green Party has its most prominent presence in the Scottish Parliament, which is elected using the additional member system of proportional representation. In the first election to this Parliament, in 1999, the Scottish Green Party got one Member of the Scottish Parliament (MSP) elected by proportional representation, Robin Harper, the UK's first elected Green parliamentarian (George MacLeod had previously represented the UK Green Party in the House of Lords). On 1 May 2003 the Scottish Greens added six new MSPs to their previous total.

In the 2007 elections, the Party lost five seats in Holyrood. However, in the council elections, taking place under the new Single Transferable Vote voting system, they gained three Councillors on the City of Edinburgh Council and five Councillors on Glasgow City Council. On 11 May, the Greens signed an agreement with the Scottish National Party (SNP), which meant that the Greens voted for Alex Salmond as First Minister and supported his initial Ministerial appointments. In return, the Nationalists backed a climate change bill as an early measure and promised to legislate against ship-to-ship oil transfers in the Firth of Forth. The SNP also agreed to nominate Patrick Harvie, one of the Green MSPs, to convene one of the Holyrood committees: Transport, Infrastructure and Climate Change.

On 28 January 2009, the two Green MSPs were instrumental in the defeat of the Government's budget, though a slightly amended version was passed easily the following week. On 31 May, Cllr Martin Ford, formerly a Liberal Democrat, joined the Scottish Green Party in protest against the plans by Donald Trump to develop on an important environmental site at Menie. On 13 October 2009, he was joined by fellow former Liberal Democrat Cllr Debra Storr. Both Councillors continued to serve on Aberdeenshire Council as members of the Democratic Independent group. At the 2012 Scottish local elections Councillor Debra Storr stood down to concentrate on her professional career. Councillor Martin Ford was re-elected, this time standing as a Scottish Green Party candidate.

After the Scottish Government announced the referendum on Scottish independence, a campaign group called Yes Scotland was established to promote a vote for independence. Leading members of the Scottish Green Party actively supported and became involved with the campaign from its foundation, with Patrick Harvie among the members of Yes Scotland's Advisory Board. In November 2013, Edinburgh councillor Maggie Chapman succeeded Martha Wardrop as the party's female co-convenor. In December, former convenor Robin Harper said that he would "absolutely vote No" in the independence referendum and offered his backing to the Better Together campaign, putting himself at odds with official party policy and its present leadership. Going on to say that he would like to help the Better Together and that there was a "significant minority" of Greens who were opposed to independence. Uniquely amongst the parties in the Scottish Parliament, the Scottish Green Party is open about and comfortable with the differences of opinion in the party on the constitutional issue, with co-convenor Patrick Harvie pointing out that "even the very firm supporters of independence within the Greens tend to be more strongly motivated by other aspects of our political agenda..."

In February 2005 the party announced plans to field candidates in 19 seats in the 2005 Westminster elections. In February 2015, the party announced that it would field candidates in 32 seats for the 2015 United Kingdom general election with 40% of their candidates being women. In 2017 the party generated some controversy by standing only 3 candidates at the general election. In the 2019 general election they contested significantly more seats in 22 constituencies. They failed to win any seats and lost their deposit in every contest.

In summer 2019, a newly adopted constitution by the party led to the 2019 Scottish Green Party co-leadership election, where Patrick Harvie and Lorna Slater were elected as co-leaders with 43.1% and 30.2% respectively.

In the 2021 Scottish Parliament election the party won a record eight Holyrood seats. Alison Johnstone was one of the eight MSPs elected for the Scottish Greens in the election, however on 13 May 2021 she gave up her party affiliation in order to become Holyrood's Presiding Officer as the position is a politically neutral role. Thus the party's number of elected representatives in the Scottish Parliament was reduced from 8 MSPs to 7.

On 20 August 2021, following two months of negotiations, they announced a new power-sharing agreement with the SNP. While not an official coalition, it would be the first time in both Scottish and UK history that Green politicians would be in government. The Greens are expected to hold two ministerial posts. The agreement will see both parties pledge for a second referendum on Scottish independence, an increase investment in active travel and public transport, enhancing tenants rights, a ten-year £500m Just Transition and establishing a National Care Service. The deal was subject to Scottish Green Party members approving the deal as "its constitution requires a power-sharing deal at Holyrood to be put to a full vote of the membership, and a two-thirds majority vote by its ruling council". On 28 August 2021, it was announced that Scottish Green members had backed the deal, with 83% of members who took part in an extraordinary general meeting voting in favour of the deal with some proxy votes still to be counted. The deal then passed the required two-thirds majority of the party's National Council, meaning the deal was then formally ratified.

At their national conference in October 2022, the Scottish Greens voted to suspend the clause of their constitution which gave members of the Green Party of England and Wales automatic rights to attend meetings of the Scottish Greens, over the issue of transphobia.

Policy

While associated mainly with environmentalist policies, the party has a history of support for communitarian economic policies, including well-funded, locally controlled public services within the confines of a steady-state economy, is supportive of proportional representation and takes a progressive approach to social policies. The party is also strongly opposed to both nuclear power and the Trident nuclear programme. It is the only party other than the SNP to both support Scottish independence and have representation in the Scottish Parliament. However, unlike the position taken by the SNP in the 2014 independence referendum, the Scottish Green Party supports Scotland having its own currency if it were to become an independent country. The party has said this would be in order to establish full economic independence, rather than being tied to the pound sterling.

The party's 2019 manifesto included pledges to implement a green new deal to tackle climate change and for future investment, introduce a universal basic income, phase in a four-day week, support rent controls and treat drug use as a health issue rather than a crime.

According to the party's website, the Scottish Greens are committed to forming a sustainable society and are guided by four interconnected principles:

Ecology: "Our environment is the basis upon which every society is formed. Whenever we damage our environment, we damage ourselves. Respect for our environment is therefore essential".
Equality: "A society that is not socially and economically just cannot be sustainable. Only when released from immediate poverty can individuals be expected to take responsibility for wider issues. Our society must be founded on cooperation and respect. We campaign hard against discrimination on grounds of gender, race, sexuality, disability, age or religion".
Radical democracy: "Politics is too often conducted in a polarised, confrontational atmosphere and in a situation remote from those that it affects. We must develop decentralised, participative systems that encourage individuals to control the decisions that affect their own lives".
Peace and nonviolence: "Violence at all levels of human interaction must be rejected and succeeded by relations characterised by flexibility, respect and fairness".

The party claims that, taken together, these principles give the party a holistic view that is in common with all Green parties around the world.

Transport
The Greens have criticised the Scottish National Party over its plans to dual the A9 and the A96, suggesting that the plans are incompatible with climate commitments.

The Scottish Greens support "the whole of Scotland’s railways – both track and train – to be brought into public ownership".

In January 2021, the Greens published transport proposals that would see a tunnel across the Forth constructed between Leith and Kirkcaldy, in the hope of shortening journey times while adding capacity by bypassing the Forth Bridge. Other upgrades included in the proposals were an aim to connect every town with more than 5,000 people to the railway network and to completely electrify the Scottish network by 2030.

Leaders

MSPs
All of the Scottish Green Party's Members of the Scottish Parliament (MSPs) have been elected under the list or "top-up" system of representation in the Parliament.

Current MSPs

 Patrick Harvie is an MSP for the Glasgow region and was elected male Co-Convenor of the Party in November 2008. He is currently the Minister for Zero Carbon Buildings, Active Travel and Tenants' Rights, one of the first Green politicians to serve in government in the UK.
 Lorna Slater is an MSP for the Lothian region and was elected female Co-Leader of the Party in August. She is currently the Minister for Green Skills, Circular Economy and Biodiversity and is one of the first Green politicians to serve in government in the UK.
 Maggie Chapman is an MSP for the North East Scotland region.
 Ariane Burgess is an MSP for the Highlands and Islands region.
 Mark Ruskell is an MSP for the Mid Scotland and Fife region. He currently is the Party’s Spokesperson for Climate, Energy, Environment, Food and Farming.
 Ross Greer is an MSP for the West Scotland region. He currently is the Party’s Spokesperson for International Development, External Affairs, Education, Skills, Culture and Media.
 Gillian Mackay is an MSP for the Central Scotland region.

Previous MSPs
 John Finnie for Highlands and Islands. Finnie was elected Green within this region in May 2016, having previously been SNP then Independent. Stood down in 2021.
 Shiona Baird for North East Scotland. Baird served as party co-convener from 2004 to 2007.
 Chris Ballance for the South of Scotland.
 Mark Ballard for the Lothians.
 Robin Harper for the Lothians. Harper was the first elected Green parliamentarian in the UK and was the party's convener from the time of that position's creation in 1999 until 2002. He later served as one of its co-conveners from 2004 to 2008.
 Eleanor Scott for the Highlands and Islands. Scott was party convener from 2002 to 2004, and a co-convener of the party from 2008 to 2011.
 Andy Wightman was an MSP for the Lothian region 2016 to 2021. He was elected for the party in the 2016 election, but left in December 2020 after facing possible complaints and disciplinary action for the way he intended to vote on an amendment to the Forensic Medical Services (Victims of Sexual Offences) (Scotland) Bill. He had planned to vote against the party and for the amendment, in conflict with the party's policy on trans rights. He stated in his resignation letter that he felt the party had an "alienating and provocative" stance on trans rights.
 John Wilson, a member of the Greens, sat as an independent MSP in the 4th Scottish Parliament, having left the SNP in September 2014 because of its change in policy on NATO membership. He stood for the Greens in the 2016 election, but was unsuccessful.
 Alison Johnstone is an MSP for the Lothian and was elected Presiding Officer of the Scottish Parliament on Thursday, 13 May 2021, giving up her party affiliation on election to the role.

Councillors
Prior to the 2007 elections, the Party had only ever elected one councillor at local level: in May 1990, Roger (aka Rory) Winter, representing the Highland Green Party (Uainich na Gàidhealtachd), was elected in Nairn as Scotland's first Green regional councillor to the then Highland Regional Council. Cllr Winter broke away from the Greens in 1991 and continued his four-year term as an Independent Green Highlander.

The party made its first major breakthroughs at council level in the 2007 local elections, electing 8 councillors between Glasgow City and the City of Edinburgh Councils.

In the 2012 local elections this was increased to 14. The party elected councillors for the first time to Aberdeenshire, Stirling & Midlothian Councils.

At the 2017 local elections, the party returned a record 19 councillors, including elected councillors to Orkney Islands Council for the first time. However, the party lost its sole councillor on Midlothian Council.

The 2022 local elections saw another record number of Green councillors elected. 35 candidates gained seats across 13 local authorities, an increase of 16. This included the first ever Green councillors in North Lanarkshire, South Lanarkshire, Argyll & Bute, Clackmannanshire, Shetland, East Lothian, Moray and the Scottish Borders.

Electoral performance
Vote share represents the party's share in Scotland rather than the UK at large.

House of Commons

Scottish Parliament

Local councils

European Parliament

See also

Green politics
List of advocates of republicanism in the United Kingdom
List of environmental organisations
Radical Independence Campaign
Renewable energy in Scotland
Scottish Campaign for Nuclear Disarmament

Related organisations

European Federation of Green Parties
Green Party Northern Ireland
Green Party of England and Wales

Footnotes

External links

Facebook
Twitter
YouTube channel

 
Pacifist parties
1990 establishments in Scotland
Constitution of the United Kingdom
European Green Party
Organisations based in Edinburgh
Political parties established in 1990
Political parties supporting universal basic income
Scottish independence